Biwabik is a city in Saint Louis County, Minnesota, United States.  The population was 961 at the 2020 census.

State Highway 135 (MN 135) and Vermilion Trail (County 4) are two of the main routes in Biwabik.

Its name is derived from the Ojibwe word for Iron: Biwabiko-nabik-wan.  Biwabik is the gateway to the East Range on the Mesabi Iron Range.

Biwabik is a Bavarian-themed town that greets visitors to Giants Ridge Resort with two award-winning golf courses and acclaimed ski area, plus trails, lakes, lodging and dining. With the Mesabi Trail connecting the community to Giants Ridge and Vermilion Trail Campground on Embarrass Lake, this scenic city is a destination any time of year. Visit during the Fourth of July for the popular Calithumpian Parade, in September for Honktoberfest, an Oktoberfest which honors Honk the Moose and come back the first Saturday in December for Weihnachtsfest, with fireworks, delightful music and food, and lights.

Recreation 
Biwabik is the home of Giants Ridge Golf and Ski Resort.  Golf Digest ranked Giants Ridge as an “Editors Choice” in 2019 as one of “The Best Golf Resorts in the Midwest.” Golf Digest has also ranked the Quarry the #1 public course in the state and #4 overall. The Legend has ranked as the #4 public course in the state and #14 overall.

The Giants Ridge Bike Park features 10 lift-served gravity (downhill) mountain bike trails Featuring berms, jumps, rollers and rock gardens, our downhill trail system is designed for riders of all ability levels and embraces the scenic but rugged terrain of Giants Ridge.  Giants Ridge welcomes XC riders to explore the 9.2 miles of purpose-built cross country mountain bike trail winding through the Superior National Forest.

Biwabik is also plays host to road cycling, mountain biking, golf, skiing, tubing, snowshoeing, boating, fishing, hunting, ATV and snowmobiling.  Biwabik is a recreational town.  The Mesabi Trail and the East Range Multi Use Trail is in Biwabik, with several connection opportunities.

Events 
The Biwabik Area Civic Association hosts several events each year:
Music in the Park - Thursday nights in the summer
City Wide Rummage Sale - Spring & Fall
Honktoberfest - Third weekend of September
Weihnachtsfest - First weekend of December

Other events include:
Pepsi Challenge ski race takes place at Giants Ridge in March.
The Minnesota High School League State Alpine and Nordic Ski Meets at Giants Ridge in February.

Geography

Unique to Biwabik is the Mary Ellen Jasper. The jasper variety was first discovered in Minnesota in the early 1900s. Mary Ellen Jasper contains 1.88-billion-year-old stromatolite fossils, It is fossilized algae, so the stromatolite is what makes the Mary Ellen unique.

History 
Daniel R. Curtin, Wisconsin State Assemblyman and businessman, at one time owned the town site of Biwabik, Minnesota. For 10 years, Curtin was in the lumber and mining business.

Biwabik is a town full of firsts. Biwabik was the first to incorporate as a village on the Iron Range in September 1892. It was also the first Iron Range town to be served by two railroads, the "Duluth & Iron Range" and the "Duluth, Missabe and Northern Railway". Biwabik had the first large mine on the Mesabi and it was the first on the Iron Range with a steam shovel to mine.

An F3 tornado destroyed homes in the northern and northwestern parts of Biwabik on October 6, 1900, killing ten people in and near the city and injuring 70; six deaths were in one family.

In 1915, a moose visited the town regularly and in the book, "Honk: The Moose", the residents named him "Honk" after the noise he made. This children's book Honk, the Moose, was written by famed author, Phil Stong and illustrated by Kurt Weise. Stong was a teacher and coach at the Biwabik school in the 1919 - 1920 school year. He featured people from Biwabik as characters. The book is a Newbery Honor and on Cattermole's 100 Best Children's Books of the 20th Century. A statue of Honk resides in the City Park on Main Street.

Peter X. Fugina (1908-1994), educator and Minnesota state legislator was born in Biwabik.

Demographics

2020 census
At the 2020 census, there were 961 people and 323 households in the city.

The racial makeup of the city was 887 White, 13 Native American, 1 Asian, 0 Pacific Islander, and 55 from two or more races.  19.4% German,  10.2% Irish, 9.4% Norwegian, 7% English, 6.5% Polish, 6.4% French, 5.5% Italian and .5% Scottish, according to the 2020 Census.

There were 323 households, of which 14.4% had children under the age of 18 living with them, 26.9% were married couples living together, 22.3% had a female householder with no husband present, 31% we male household, no spouse present. 21.4% had someone living alone who was 65 years of age or older. The average family size was 2.5.

14.4% of the population were under the age of 18, 85.6% from 18 and over, with 21.4 who were 65 years of age or older. The median age was 45.5 years. 

The median household income was $41,719 and the median family income was $74,593. About 15.9% of people were below the poverty line, including 10.5% of those under age 18 and 4.7% of those age 65 or over.

See also
 Honk, the Moose, a children's novel based on a story taking place in Biwabik.  Written by Phil Stong, illustrated by Kurt Weise.

References

External links
 City of Biwabik official website
Biwabik Area Civic Association official website
 Biwabik history and information

Cities in Minnesota
Cities in St. Louis County, Minnesota
Mining communities in Minnesota